Drona is a 2009 Indian Telugu-language action film directed by J.Karun Kumar and produced by D. S. Rao. The film stars Nithiin and Priyamani while Kelly Dorjee, Mukesh Rishi, Sita, Sunil, and Raghubabu play supporting roles. The music composed by Anup Rubens. The film released in 2009. The film was later dubbed into Hindi & Malayalam as Sarfira - The Power Man & Drona.

Plot
Drona (Nithiin) is the only son of (Mukesh Rishi) and Sita. Drona’s father Mukesh Rushi is an honest and dedicated Police officer. Drona likes his mother Meenakshi (Sita) so much and love her as his own life. When he was a child Drona steals his father’s revolver to scare his friends. On knowing this his father scolds him, consequently Drona leaves his home and gets lost. After 20 years, he comes back to his parents with the name Chandu. A Neighboring girl Indu (Priyamani) likes Drona/Chandu a lot. On a fateful day, she finds out that Chandu is none other than the long lost boy, Drona. It's revealed that Drona and his friend were kidnapped along with other boys. They were forced to become thieves. Drona had no other choice to kill a group of police officers in self-defense, while trying to escape with the jewelry because the bad guys have to take poison out of Drona's body and the other guys might get killed by the bad guys. The officers had to shoot Drona. Drona made a bad choice to kill 2 innocent people flying a police helicopter. Drona shouldn't have killed the people, who were flying the helicopter. Drona becomes an approver to send the robbers and their kingpin to jail.

Cast

 Nithiin as Drona
 Priyamani as Indu
 Mukesh Rishi as Drona's father and Police Officer
 Kelly Dorjee as Sarkar (International Terrorist)
 Sunil
 Raghu Babu
 Sivaprasad
 Satya
 Karate Kalyani
 Rakhi Sawant as item number "Sayyare Sayya"

Soundtrack

The music was composed by Anup Rubens and released by Aditya Music.

Critical reception

The film opened to mostly negative reviews.

Idlebrain Jeevi in his review Stated that "the main drawbacks of the film are incompetent direction and bad villain characterization. When the villain’s character is not etched properly, the heroism does not get elevated. It may find some favor in B and C centers. On a whole, Drona is a badly shot film"

Awards
Sai Krishna won the Nandi Award for Best Child Actor

References

 News Source:indiaglitz.com . Fair use under educational and information purpose.

External links 
 

2000s Telugu-language films
2000s heist films
2009 action films
2009 films
Indian heist films
Indian action films
2000s masala films